This is a list of Belgian television related events from 2001.

Events
14 April - Singer Sam Gooris wins the first season of Big Brother VIPs.
16 December - Ellen Dufour wins the second season of Big Brother.

Debuts

Television shows

1990s
Samson en Gert (1990–present)
Familie (1991–present)
Wittekerke (1993-2008)
Thuis (1995–present)
Wie wordt multimiljonair? (1999-2002)
Wizzy & Woppy (1999-2007)

2000s
Big & Betsy (2000-2003)
Big Brother (2000-2007)

Ending this year

Births

Deaths

See also
2001 in Belgium